Fillmore is an unincorporated community in Washington County, in the U.S. state of Ohio.

History
The first settlement at what is now Fillmore was made in 1816. A post office called Fillmore was established in 1851, and remained in operation until 1905.

References

Unincorporated communities in Washington County, Ohio
Unincorporated communities in Ohio